Detweiler is a surname of German origin. Notable people with the surname include:

 Alan Detweiler, Canadian composer, writer, and patron of the arts
 Craig Detweiler, American writer, filmmaker and cultural commentator
 Robert Slerling "Ducky" Detweiler, former Major League Baseball player
 Frederick German Detweiler, American sociologist and expert on race relations
 Robert Detweiler, American competition rower, Olympic champion, naval officer, and scientist

Fictional characters
The Detweiler family, a prominent clan of genetically engineered humans from David Weber's Honorverse
Theodore Jasper "T.J." Detweiller, one of the main protagonists in Recess
Barry "Dutch" Detweiler, protagonist of Fedora''
Max Detweiler, character in The Sound of Music based on Franz Wasner

See also
Dettwiller in France,  Dettweiler

German-language surnames
Germanic-language surnames
Surnames of German origin